Sangar is a village in Hamaijan Rural District, Hamaijan District, Sepidan County, Fars Province, Iran. At the 2006 census, its population was 622, in 137 families.

Notable people
Navid Afkari

References 

Populated places in Sepidan County